Joga Musahib is a village located in the Karail area of Mohammadabad tehsil in Ghazipur district in the Indian state of Uttar Pradesh. It had a population of 3,612 in the 2011 Census. Its local administration follows the Panchayati Raj system.

History
Babu Ram Chandra Sharma established the village in 1446. He was one of the seventeen grandsons of Babu Nainan Shah. During the reign of Sultan Alam Shah of the Sayyid dynasty in Delhi, Babu Ram Chandra Sharma moved from Karimuddinpur to Joga Musahib.

Babu Nainan Shah, the son of Prithuraj Shah (Karimuddinpur), had two sons. The two sons had seventeen sons, each of whom went on to establish a different village in Kargil Kshetra known as "Sataraho".

The Sataraho branch of the Kinwar clan tell a famous story. One of the young members of Babu Sangram Rai's family of Sonari, was a cavalry officer in the Tughulaq army. He acted bravely in the war against the Bengal rebels. For this bravery, he was awarded a jagir in Singhabad of the Malda district. Later, Raja Bhairvendra Narayan Roy of Singhabad (Malda) earned a reputation during the struggle for India's independence.

Administration
Joga Musahib is part of the Mohammadabad assembly seat of Ballia Lok Sabha constituency. However, it is administered by Mohammadabad tehsil (township), under Ghazipur district.

Joga Musahib has its own Panchayat. The Sarpanch (Pradhan) of Joga is Shri Ramesh Rai.

Transport
Other nearby railway stations are Karimuddinpur, Yusufpur and Buxar. It is also accessible by road.

Culture
The primary language is a mix of Bhojpuri and Hindi. Culturally, the area is greatly influenced by Ballia, which is a nearby cultural center.

References

External links
Villages in Ghazipur, Uttar Pradesh

Villages in Ghazipur district